Dallas Malloy is known for being a boxer who defeated Heather Poyner in the United States’ first sanctioned amateur boxing match between two female boxers.

Boxing
Malloy was denied an application by USA Boxing due to being female. She sued and U.S. District Judge Barbara Rothstein allowed her to box by granting a preliminary injunction. In October 1993, Malloy defeated Heather Poyner in the United States’ first sanctioned amateur boxing match between two female boxers. USA Boxing lifted its ban on women's boxing later in 1993.

Appearance in Jerry Maguire
Malloy portrayed herself in the opening scene of Jerry Maguire, in which she appeared as Tom Cruise talked about her.

Personal life
Malloy is a recovering alcoholic and drug addict; she has stayed sober since January 14, 1997. In 1999 she stopped smoking.

References 

Living people
21st-century American actresses
American women boxers
Boxers from Los Angeles
Year of birth missing (living people)